Tout Alizée (English: Everything Alizée) is the title of a compilation album released by French singer Alizée. The album was released to stores on 10 December 2007 in Mexico only, being a compilation released by Alizée's old music label Universal Music in an attempt to cash-in on her recent success in the country, the album was backed with a bonus DVD with some of her music videos.

Track listing
CD
"Moi... Lolita"
"Gourmandises"
"L'Alizé"
"J.B.G."
"Parler tout bas"
"J'en ai marre!"
"À contre-courant"
"Hey! Amigo!"
"Youpidou"
"Amélie m'a dit"
"J'ai pas vingt ans!"
"Moi... Lolita" (Lola Extended Remix)
"Moi... Lolita" (Hello Helli T'es A Dance Remix)
"I'm Fed Up!" (Bubbly Club Remix)
"J'en ai marre!" (Soft Skin Club Mix)

DVD
"Gourmandises"
"Moi... Lolita"
"Parler tout bas"
"J'ai pas vingt ans!"
"I'm Not Twenty"
"J'en ai marre!"
"I'm Fed Up!"
Documentary: Tubes D'un Jour

Charts
The album debuted at number sixty-two in the Mexican Top 100 Albums Chart, and number eighteen on the International Top 20 Albums Chart.

References

External links
Official website

2007 compilation albums
2007 video albums
Alizée albums
Music video compilation albums
Universal Records compilation albums
Universal Records video albums